Harry McKinley Lightsey Sr. (February 3, 1901 – February 24, 1986) was an American college football player and coach, politician, and judge. He served as the head football coach at the University of South Carolina in Columbia, South Carolina in 1927, compiling a record of 4–5.

Head coaching record

College

References

External links
  Sports Reference profile
 

1901 births
1986 deaths
American football guards
South Carolina Gamecocks football coaches
South Carolina Gamecocks football players
High school football coaches in South Carolina
South Carolina state court judges
People from Hampton County, South Carolina
20th-century American judges